A circadian rhythm, or circadian cycle, is a natural, internal process that regulates the sleep–wake cycle and repeats roughly every 24 hours. It can refer to any process that originates within an organism (i.e., endogenous) and responds to the environment (entrained by the environment). These 24-hour rhythms are driven by a circadian clock, and they have been widely observed in animals, plants, fungi and cyanobacteria.

Processes with 24-hour cycles are more generally called diurnal rhythms; diurnal rhythms should not be called circadian rhythms unless they can be confirmed as endogenous, and not environmental.

Although circadian rhythms are endogenous, they are adjusted to the local environment by external cues called zeitgebers (from German ), which include light, temperature and redox cycles. In clinical settings, an abnormal circadian rhythm in humans is known as a circadian rhythm sleep disorder.

History
While there are multiple mentions of "natural body cycle" in Eastern and Native American cultures, the earliest recorded Western account of a circadian process is credited to Theophrastus, dating from the 4th century BC, probably provided to him by report of Androsthenes, a ship's captain serving under Alexander the Great. In his book, 'Περὶ φυτῶν ἱστορία', or 'Enquiry into plants', Theophrastus describes a "tree  with many leaves like the rose, and that this closes at night, but opens at sunrise, and by noon is completely unfolded; and at evening again it closes by degrees and remains shut at night, and the natives say that it goes to sleep." The tree mentioned by him was much later identified as the tamarind tree by the botanist, H Bretzl, in his book on the botanical findings of the Alexandrian campaigns.

The observation of a circadian or diurnal process in humans is mentioned in Chinese medical texts dated to around the 13th century, including the Noon and Midnight Manual and the Mnemonic Rhyme to Aid in the Selection of Acu-points According to the Diurnal Cycle, the Day of the Month and the Season of the Year.

In 1729, French scientist Jean-Jacques d'Ortous de Mairan conducted the first experiment designed to distinguish an endogenous clock from responses to daily stimuli. He noted that 24-hour patterns in the movement of the leaves of the plant Mimosa pudica persisted, even when the plants were kept in constant darkness.

In 1896, Patrick and Gilbert observed that during a prolonged period of sleep deprivation, sleepiness increases and decreases with a period of approximately 24 hours. In 1918, J.S. Szymanski showed that animals are capable of maintaining 24-hour activity patterns in the absence of external cues such as light and changes in temperature.

In the early 20th century, circadian rhythms were noticed in the rhythmic feeding times of bees. Auguste Forel, Ingeborg Beling, and Oskar Wahl conducted numerous experiments to determine whether this rhythm was attributable to an endogenous clock. The existence of circadian rhythm was independently discovered in fruit flies in 1935 by two German zoologists, Hans Kalmus and Erwin Bünning.

In 1954, an important experiment reported by Colin Pittendrigh demonstrated that eclosion (the process of pupa turning into adult) in Drosophila pseudoobscura was a circadian behaviour. He demonstrated that while temperature played a vital role in eclosion rhythm, the period of eclosion was delayed but not stopped when temperature was decreased.

The term circadian was coined by Franz Halberg in 1959. According to Halberg's original definition:

In 1977, the International Committee on Nomenclature of the International Society for Chronobiology formally adopted the definition:

Ron Konopka and Seymour Benzer identified the first clock mutation in Drosophila in 1971, naming the gene "period" (per) gene, the first discovered genetic determinant of behavioral rhythmicity. per gene was isolated in 1984 by two teams of researchers. Konopka, Jeffrey Hall, Michael Roshbash and their team showed that per locus is the centre of the circadian rhythm, and that loss of per stops circadian activity.  At the same time, Michael W. Young's team reported similar effects of per, and that the gene covers 7.1-kilobase (kb) interval on the X chromosome and encodes a 4.5-kb poly(A)+ RNA. They went on to discover the key genes and neurones in Drosophila circadian system, for which Hall, Rosbash and Young received the Nobel Prize in Physiology or Medicine 2017.

Joseph Takahashi discovered the first mammalian circadian clock mutation (clockΔ19) using mice in 1994. However, recent studies show that deletion of clock does not lead to a behavioral phenotype (the animals still have normal circadian rhythms), which questions its importance in rhythm generation.

The first human clock mutation was identified in an extended Utah family by Chris Jones, and genetically characterized by Ying-Hui Fu and Louis Ptacek. Affected individuals are extreme 'morning larks' with 4-hour advanced sleep and other rhythms. This form of familial advanced sleep phase syndrome is caused by a single amino acid change, S662➔G, in the human PER2 protein.

Criteria

To be called circadian, a biological rhythm must meet these three general criteria: 
 The rhythm has an endogenous free-running period that lasts approximately 24 hours. The rhythm persists in constant conditions, i.e. constant darkness, with a period of about 24 hours. The period of the rhythm in constant conditions is called the free-running period and is denoted by the Greek letter τ (tau). The rationale for this criterion is to distinguish circadian rhythms from simple responses to daily external cues. A rhythm cannot be said to be endogenous unless it has been tested and persists in conditions without external periodic input. In diurnal animals (active during daylight hours), in general τ is slightly greater than 24 hours, whereas, in nocturnal animals (active at night), in general τ is shorter than 24 hours.
 The rhythms are entrainable. The rhythm can be reset by exposure to external stimuli (such as light and heat), a process called entrainment. The external stimulus used to entrain a rhythm is called the zeitgeber, or "time giver".  Travel across time zones illustrates the ability of the human biological clock to adjust to the local time; a person will usually experience jet lag before entrainment of their circadian clock has brought it into sync with local time.
 The rhythms exhibit temperature compensation. In other words, they maintain circadian periodicity over a range of physiological temperatures. Many organisms live at a broad range of temperatures, and differences in thermal energy will affect the kinetics of all molecular processes in their . In order to keep track of time, the organism's circadian clock must maintain roughly a 24-hour periodicity despite the changing kinetics, a property known as temperature compensation. The Q10 temperature coefficient is a measure of this compensating effect. If the Q10 coefficient remains approximately 1 as temperature increases, the rhythm is considered to be temperature-compensated.

Origin

Circadian rhythms allow organisms to anticipate and prepare for precise and regular environmental changes. They thus enable organisms to make better use of environmental resources (e.g. light and food) compared to those that cannot predict such availability. It has therefore been suggested that circadian rhythms put organisms at a selective advantage in evolutionary terms. However, rhythmicity appears to be as important in regulating and coordinating internal metabolic processes, as in coordinating with the environment. This is suggested by the maintenance (heritability) of circadian rhythms in fruit flies after several hundred generations in constant laboratory conditions, as well as in creatures in constant darkness in the wild, and by the experimental elimination of behavioral—but not physiological—circadian rhythms in quail.

What drove circadian rhythms to evolve has been an enigmatic question. Previous hypotheses emphasized that photosensitive proteins and circadian rhythms may have originated together in the earliest cells, with the purpose of protecting replicating DNA from high levels of damaging ultraviolet radiation during the daytime. As a result, replication was relegated to the dark. However, evidence for this is lacking: in fact the simplest organisms with a circadian rhythm, the cyanobacteria, do the opposite of this: they divide more in the daytime. Recent studies instead highlight the importance of co-evolution of redox proteins with circadian oscillators in all three domains of life following the Great Oxidation Event approximately 2.3 billion years ago. The current view is that circadian changes in environmental oxygen levels and the production of reactive oxygen species (ROS) in the presence of daylight are likely to have driven a need to evolve circadian rhythms to preempt, and therefore counteract, damaging redox reactions on a daily basis.

The simplest known circadian clocks are bacterial circadian rhythms, exemplified by the prokaryote cyanobacteria. Recent research has demonstrated that the circadian clock of Synechococcus elongatus can be reconstituted in vitro with just the three proteins (KaiA, KaiB, KaiC) of their central oscillator. This clock has been shown to sustain a 22-hour rhythm over several days upon the addition of ATP. Previous explanations of the prokaryotic circadian timekeeper were dependent upon a DNA transcription/translation feedback mechanism.

A defect in the human homologue of the Drosophila "period" gene was identified as a cause of the sleep disorder FASPS (Familial advanced sleep phase syndrome), underscoring the conserved nature of the molecular circadian clock through evolution. Many more genetic components of the biological clock are now known. Their interactions result in an interlocked feedback loop of gene products resulting in periodic fluctuations that the cells of the body interpret as a specific time of the day.

It is now known that the molecular circadian clock can function within a single cell. That is, it is cell-autonomous. This was shown by Gene Block in isolated mollusk basal retinal neurons (BRNs). At the same time, different cells may communicate with each other resulting in a synchronised output of electrical signaling. These may interface with endocrine glands of the brain to result in periodic release of hormones. The receptors for these hormones may be located far across the body and synchronise the peripheral clocks of various organs. Thus, the information of the time of the day as relayed by the eyes travels to the clock in the brain, and, through that, clocks in the rest of the body may be synchronised. This is how the timing of, for example, sleep/wake, body temperature, thirst, and appetite are coordinately controlled by the biological clock.

Importance in animals
Circadian rhythmicity is present in the sleeping and feeding patterns of animals, including human beings. There are also clear patterns of core body temperature, brain wave activity, hormone production, cell regeneration, and other biological activities. In addition, photoperiodism, the physiological reaction of organisms to the length of day or night, is vital to both plants and animals, and the circadian system plays a role in the measurement and interpretation of day length. Timely prediction of seasonal periods of weather conditions, food availability, or predator activity is crucial for survival of many species. Although not the only parameter, the changing length of the photoperiod (day length) is the most predictive environmental cue for the seasonal timing of physiology and behavior, most notably for timing of migration, hibernation, and reproduction.

Effect of circadian disruption
Mutations or deletions of clock genes in mice have demonstrated the importance of body clocks to ensure the proper timing of cellular/metabolic events; clock-mutant mice are hyperphagic and obese, and have altered glucose metabolism. In mice, deletion of the Rev-ErbA alpha clock gene can result in diet-induced obesity and changes the balance between glucose and lipid utilization, predisposing to diabetes. However, it is not clear whether there is a strong association between clock gene polymorphisms in humans and the susceptibility to develop the metabolic syndrome.

Effect of light–dark cycle
The rhythm is linked to the light–dark cycle. Animals, including humans, kept in total darkness for extended periods eventually function with a free-running rhythm. Their sleep cycle is pushed back or forward each "day", depending on whether their "day", their endogenous period, is shorter or longer than 24 hours. The environmental cues that reset the rhythms each day are called zeitgebers. Totally blind subterranean mammals (e.g., blind mole rat Spalax sp.) are able to maintain their endogenous clocks in the apparent absence of external stimuli. Although they lack image-forming eyes, their photoreceptors (which detect light) are still functional; they do surface periodically as well.

Free-running organisms that normally have one or two consolidated sleep episodes will still have them when in an environment shielded from external cues, but the rhythm is not entrained to the 24-hour light–dark cycle in nature. The sleep–wake rhythm may, in these circumstances, become out of phase with other circadian or ultradian rhythms such as metabolic, hormonal, CNS electrical, or neurotransmitter rhythms.

Recent research has influenced the design of spacecraft environments, as systems that mimic the light–dark cycle have been found to be highly beneficial to astronauts. Light therapy has been trialed as a treatment for sleep disorders.

Arctic animals
Norwegian researchers at the University of Tromsø have shown that some Arctic animals (e.g., ptarmigan, reindeer) show circadian rhythms only in the parts of the year that have daily sunrises and sunsets. In one study of reindeer, animals at 70 degrees North showed circadian rhythms in the autumn, winter and spring, but not in the summer.  Reindeer on Svalbard at 78 degrees North showed such rhythms only in autumn and spring. The researchers suspect that other Arctic animals as well may not show circadian rhythms in the constant light of summer and the constant dark of winter.

A 2006 study in northern Alaska found that day-living ground squirrels and nocturnal porcupines strictly maintain their circadian rhythms through 82 days and nights of sunshine. The researchers speculate that these two rodents notice that the apparent distance between the sun and the horizon is shortest once a day, and thus have a sufficient signal to entrain (adjust) by.

Butterfly and moth
The navigation of the fall migration of the Eastern North American monarch butterfly (Danaus plexippus) to their overwintering grounds in central Mexico uses a time-compensated sun compass that depends upon a circadian clock in their antennae. Circadian rhythm is also known to control mating behavior in certain moth species such as Spodoptera littoralis, where females produce specific pheromone that attracts and resets the male circadian rhythm to induce mating at night.

In plants

Plant circadian rhythms tell the plant what season it is and when to flower for the best chance of attracting pollinators. Behaviors showing rhythms include leaf movement, growth, germination, stomatal/gas exchange, enzyme activity, photosynthetic activity, and fragrance emission, among others. Circadian rhythms occur as a plant entrains to synchronize with the light cycle of its surrounding environment. These rhythms are endogenously generated, self-sustaining and are relatively constant over a range of ambient temperatures. Important features include two interacting transcription-translation feedback loops: proteins containing PAS domains, which facilitate protein-protein interactions; and several photoreceptors that fine-tune the clock to different light conditions. Anticipation of changes in the environment allows appropriate changes in a plant's physiological state, conferring an adaptive advantage. A better understanding of plant circadian rhythms has applications in agriculture, such as helping farmers stagger crop harvests to extend crop availability and securing against massive losses due to weather.

Light is the signal by which plants synchronize their internal clocks to their environment and is sensed by a wide variety of photoreceptors. Red and blue light are absorbed through several phytochromes and cryptochromes. One phytochrome, phyA, is the main phytochrome in seedlings grown in the dark but rapidly degrades in light to produce Cry1. The cryptochrome (cry) gene is also a light-sensitive component of the circadian clock and is thought to be involved both as a photoreceptor and as part of the clock's endogenous pacemaker mechanism. Cryptochromes 1–2 (involved in blue–UVA) help to maintain the period length in the clock through a whole range of light conditions.

The central oscillator generates a self-sustaining rhythm and is driven by two interacting feedback loops that are active at different times of day. The morning loop consists of CCA1 (Circadian and Clock-Associated 1) and LHY (Late Elongated Hypocotyl), which encode closely related MYB transcription factors that regulate circadian rhythms in Arabidopsis, as well as PRR 7 and 9 (Pseudo-Response Regulators.)  The evening loop consists of GI (Gigantea) and ELF4, both involved in regulation of flowering time genes. When CCA1 and LHY are overexpressed (under constant light or dark conditions), plants become arrhythmic, and mRNA signals reduce, contributing to a negative feedback loop. Gene expression of CCA1 and LHY oscillates and peaks in the early morning, whereas TOC1 gene expression oscillates and peaks in the early evening. While it was previously hypothesised that these three genes model a negative feedback loop in which over-expressed CCA1 and LHY repress TOC1 and over-expressed TOC1 is a positive regulator of CCA1 and LHY, it was shown in 2012 by Andrew Millar and others that TOC1, in fact, serves as a repressor not only of CCA1, LHY, and PRR7 and 9 in the morning loop but also of GI and ELF4 in the evening loop. This finding and further computational modeling of TOC1 gene functions and interactions suggest a reframing of the plant circadian clock as a triple negative-component repressilator model rather than the positive/negative-element feedback loop characterizing the clock in mammals.

In 2018, researchers found that the expression of PRR5 and TOC1 hnRNA nascent transcripts follows the same oscillatory pattern as processed mRNA transcripts rhythmically in A. thaliana. LNKs binds to the 5'region of PRR5 and TOC1 and interacts with RNAP II and other transcription factors. Moreover, RVE8-LNKs interaction enables a permissive histone-methylation pattern (H3K4me3) to be modified and the histone-modification itself parallels the oscillation of clock gene expression.

It has previously been found that matching a plant's circadian rhythm to its external environment's light and dark cycles has the potential to positively affect the plant. Researchers came to this conclusion by performing experiments on three different varieties of Arabidopsis thaliana. One of these varieties had a normal 24-hour circadian cycle. The other two varieties were mutated, one to have a circadian cycle of more than 27 hours, and one to have a shorter than normal circadian cycle of 20 hours.

The Arabidopsis with the 24-hour circadian cycle was grown in three different environments. One of these environments had a 20-hour light and dark cycle (10 hours of light and 10 hours of dark), the other had a 24-hour light and dark cycle (12 hours of light and 12 hours of dark),and the final environment had a 28-hour light and dark cycle (14 hours of light and 14 hours of dark). The two mutated plants were grown in both an environment that had a 20-hour light and dark cycle and in an environment that had a 28-hour light and dark cycle. It was found that the variety of Arabidopsis with a 24-hour circadian rhythm cycle grew best in an environment that also had a 24-hour light and dark cycle. Overall, it was found that all the varieties of Arabidopsis thaliana had greater levels of chlorophyll and increased growth in environments whose light and dark cycles matched their circadian rhythm.

Researchers suggested that a reason for this could be that matching an Arabidopsis circadian rhythm to its environment could allow the plant to be better prepared for dawn and dusk, and thus be able to better synchronize its processes. In this study, it was also found that the genes that help to control chlorophyll peaked a few hours after dawn. This appears to be consistent with the proposed phenomenon known as metabolic dawn.

According to the metabolic dawn hypothesis, sugars produced by photosynthesis have potential to help regulate the circadian rhythm and certain photosynthetic and metabolic pathways. As the sun rises, more light becomes available, which normally allows more photosynthesis to occur. The sugars produced by photosynthesis repress PRR7. This repression of PRR7 then leads to the increased expression of CCA1. On the other hand, decreased photosynthetic sugar levels increase PRR7 expression and decrease CCA1 expression. This feedback loop between CCA1 and PRR7 is what is proposed to cause metabolic dawn.

In Drosophila

The molecular mechanism of circadian rhythm and light perception are best understood in Drosophila. Clock genes are discovered from Drosophila, and they act together with the clock neurones. There are two unique rhythms, one during the process of hatching (called eclosion) from the pupa, and the other during mating. The clock neurones are located in distinct clusters in the central brain. The best-understood clock neurones are the large and small lateral ventral neurons (l-LNvs and s-LNvs) of the optic lobe. These neurones produce pigment dispersing factor (PDF), a neuropeptide that acts as a circadian neuromodulator between different clock neurones.

Drosophila circadian rhythm is through a transcription-translation feedback loop. The core clock mechanism consists of two interdependent feedback loops, namely the PER/TIM loop and the CLK/CYC loop. The CLK/CYC loop occurs during the day and initiates the transcription of the per and tim genes. But their proteins levels remain low until dusk, because during daylight also activates the doubletime (dbt) gene. DBT protein causes phosphorylation and turnover of monomeric PER proteins. TIM is also phosphorylated by shaggy until sunset. After sunset, DBT disappears, so that PER molecules stably bind to TIM. PER/TIM dimer enters the nucleus several at night, and binds to CLK/CYC dimers. Bound PER completely stops the transcriptional activity of CLK and CYC.

In the early morning, light activates the cry gene and its protein CRY causes the breakdown of TIM. Thus PER/TIM dimer dissociates, and the unbound PER becomes unstable. PER undergoes progressive phosphorylation and ultimately degradation. Absence of PER and TIM allows activation of clk and cyc genes. Thus, the clock is reset to start the next circadian cycle.

PER-TIM model
This protein model was developed based on the oscillations of the PER and TIM proteins in the Drosophila. It is based on its predecessor, the PER model where it was explained how the PER gene and its protein influence the biological clock. The model includes the formation of a nuclear PER-TIM complex which influences the transcription of the PER and the TIM genes (by providing negative feedback) and the multiple phosphorylation of these two proteins. The circadian oscillations of these two proteins seem to synchronise with the light-dark cycle even if they are not necessarily dependent on it. Both PER and TIM proteins are phosphorylated and after they form the PER-TIM nuclear complex they return inside the nucleus to stop the expression of the PER and TIM mRNA. This inhibition lasts as long as the protein, or the mRNA is not degraded. When this happens, the complex releases the inhibition. Here can also be mentioned that the degradation of the TIM protein is sped up by light.

In mammals

The primary circadian clock in mammals is located in the suprachiasmatic nucleus (or nuclei) (SCN), a pair of distinct groups of cells located in the hypothalamus. Destruction of the SCN results in the complete absence of a regular sleep–wake rhythm. The SCN receives information about illumination through the eyes. The retina of the eye contains "classical" photoreceptors ("rods" and "cones"), which are used for conventional vision. But the retina also contains specialized ganglion cells that are directly photosensitive, and project directly to the SCN, where they help in the entrainment (synchronization) of this master circadian clock. The proteins involved in the SCN clock are homologous to those found in the fruit fly.

These cells contain the photopigment melanopsin and their signals follow a pathway called the retinohypothalamic tract, leading to the SCN. If cells from the SCN are removed and cultured, they maintain their own rhythm in the absence of external cues.

The SCN takes the information on the lengths of the day and night from the retina, interprets it, and passes it on to the pineal gland, a tiny structure shaped like a pine cone and located on the epithalamus. In response, the pineal secretes the hormone melatonin. Secretion of melatonin peaks at night and ebbs during the day and its presence provides information about night-length.

Several studies have indicated that pineal melatonin feeds back on SCN rhythmicity to modulate circadian patterns of activity and other processes. However, the nature and system-level significance of this feedback are unknown.

The circadian rhythms of humans can be entrained to slightly shorter and longer periods than the Earth's 24 hours. Researchers at Harvard have shown that human subjects can at least be entrained to a 23.5-hour cycle and a 24.65-hour cycle.

Humans 

Early research into circadian rhythms suggested that most people preferred a day closer to 25 hours when isolated from external stimuli like daylight and timekeeping. However, this research was faulty because it failed to shield the participants from artificial light. Although subjects were shielded from time cues (like clocks) and daylight, the researchers were not aware of the phase-delaying effects of indoor electric lights. The subjects were allowed to turn on light when they were awake and to turn it off when they wanted to sleep. Electric light in the evening delayed their circadian phase. A more stringent study conducted in 1999 by Harvard University estimated the natural human rhythm to be closer to 24 hours and 11 minutes: much closer to the solar day. Consistent with this research was a more recent study from 2010, which also identified sex differences, with the circadian period for women being slightly shorter (24.09 hours) than for men (24.19 hours). In this study, women tended to wake up earlier than men and exhibit a greater preference for morning activities than men, although the underlying biological mechanisms for these differences are unknown.

Biological markers and effects 
The classic phase markers for measuring the timing of a mammal's circadian rhythm are:
 melatonin secretion by the pineal gland,
 core body temperature minimum, and
 plasma level of cortisol.
For temperature studies, subjects must remain awake but calm and semi-reclined in near darkness while their rectal temperatures are taken continuously. Though variation is great among normal chronotypes, the average human adult's temperature reaches its minimum at about 5:00 a.m., about two hours before habitual wake time. Baehr et al. found that, in young adults, the daily body temperature minimum occurred at about 04:00 (4 a.m.) for morning types, but at about 06:00 (6 a.m.) for evening types. This minimum occurred at approximately the middle of the eight-hour sleep period for morning types, but closer to waking in evening types.

Melatonin is absent from the system or undetectably low during daytime. Its onset in dim light, dim-light melatonin onset (DLMO), at roughly 21:00 (9 p.m.) can be measured in the blood or the saliva. Its major metabolite can also be measured in morning urine. Both DLMO and the midpoint (in time) of the presence of the hormone in the blood or saliva have been used as circadian markers. However, newer research indicates that the melatonin offset may be the more reliable marker. Benloucif et al. found that melatonin phase markers were more stable and more highly correlated with the timing of sleep than the core temperature minimum. They found that both sleep offset and melatonin offset are more strongly correlated with phase markers than the onset of sleep. In addition, the declining phase of the melatonin levels is more reliable and stable than the termination of melatonin synthesis.

Other physiological changes that occur according to a circadian rhythm include heart rate and many cellular processes "including oxidative stress, cell metabolism, immune and inflammatory responses, epigenetic modification, hypoxia/hyperoxia response pathways, endoplasmic reticular stress, autophagy, and regulation of the stem cell environment." In a study of young men, it was found that the heart rate reaches its lowest average rate during sleep, and its highest average rate shortly after waking.

In contradiction to previous studies, it has been found that there is no effect of body temperature on performance on psychological tests. This is likely due to evolutionary pressures for higher cognitive function compared to the other areas of function examined in previous studies.

Outside the "master clock"
More-or-less independent circadian rhythms are found in many organs and cells in the body outside the suprachiasmatic nuclei (SCN), the "master clock". Indeed, neuroscientist Joseph Takahashi and colleagues stated in a 2013 article that "almost every cell in the body contains a circadian clock".  For example, these clocks, called peripheral oscillators, have been found in the adrenal gland, oesophagus, lungs, liver, pancreas, spleen, thymus, and skin. There is also some evidence that the olfactory bulb and prostate may experience oscillations, at least when cultured.

Though oscillators in the skin respond to light, a systemic influence has not been proven. In addition, many oscillators, such as liver cells, for example, have been shown to respond to inputs other than light, such as feeding.

Light and the biological clock

Light resets the biological clock in accordance with the phase response curve (PRC). Depending on the timing, light can advance or delay the circadian rhythm. Both the PRC and the required illuminance vary from species to species, and lower light levels are required to reset the clocks in nocturnal rodents than in humans.

Enforced longer or shorter cycles
Various studies on humans have made use of enforced sleep/wake cycles strongly different from 24 hours, such as those conducted by Nathaniel Kleitman in 1938 (28 hours) and Derk-Jan Dijk and Charles Czeisler in the 1990s (20 hours). Because people with a normal (typical) circadian clock cannot entrain to such abnormal day/night rhythms, this is referred to as a forced desynchrony protocol. Under such a protocol, sleep and wake episodes are uncoupled from the body's endogenous circadian period, which allows researchers to assess the effects of circadian phase (i.e., the relative timing of the circadian cycle) on aspects of sleep and wakefulness including sleep latency and other functions - both physiological, behavioral, and cognitive.

Studies also show that Cyclosa turbinata is unique in that its locomotor and web-building activity cause it to have an exceptionally short-period circadian clock, about 19 hours. When C. turbinata spiders are placed into chambers with periods of 19, 24, or 29 hours of evenly split light and dark, none of the spiders exhibited decreased longevity in their own circadian clock. These findings suggest that C. turbinata do not have the same costs of extreme desynchronization as do other species of animals.

Human Health

Foundation of circadian medicine
The leading edge of circadian biology research is translation of basic body clock mechanisms into clinical tools, and this is especially relevant to the treatment of cardiovascular disease. This is leading to the development of an entirely new field of medicine, termed Circadian Medicine. Pioneering research reveals that Circadian Medicine can lead to longer and healthier lives. For example: 1) "Circadian Lighting" or reducing adverse light at night in hospitals may improve patient outcomes post-myocardial infarction (heart attack). 2) "Circadian Chronotherapy" or timing of medications can reduce adverse cardiac remodeling in patients with heart disease. Timing of medical treatment in coordination with the body clock, chronotherapeutics, may also benefit patients with hypertension (high blood pressure) by significantly increasing efficacy and reduce drug toxicity or adverse reactions. 3) "Circadian Pharmacology" or drugs targeting the circadian clock mechanism have been shown experimentally in rodent models to significantly reduce the damage due to heart attacks and prevent heart failure. Importantly, for rational translation of the most promising Circadian Medicine therapies to clinical practice, it is imperative that we understand how it helps treats disease in both biological sexes.

Causes of Disruption to Circadian Rhythms

Indoor lighting 
Lighting requirements for circadian regulation are not simply the same as those for vision; planning of indoor lighting in offices and institutions is beginning to take this into account. Animal studies on the effects of light in laboratory conditions have until recently considered light intensity (irradiance) but not color, which can be shown to "act as an essential regulator of biological timing in more natural settings".

Blue LED lighting suppresses melatonin production five times more than the orange-yellow high-pressure sodium (HPS) light; a metal halide lamp, which is white light, suppresses melatonin at a rate more than three times greater than HPS. Depression symptoms from long term nighttime light exposure can be undone by returning to a normal cycle.

Airline pilots and cabin crew 
Due to the work nature of airline pilots, who often cross several time zones and regions of sunlight and darkness in one day, and spend many hours awake both day and night, they are often unable to maintain sleep patterns that correspond to the natural human circadian rhythm; this situation can easily lead to fatigue. The NTSB cites this as contributing to many accidents, and has conducted several research studies in order to find methods of combating fatigue in pilots.

Effect of drugs 
Studies conducted on both animals and humans show major bidirectional relationships between the circadian system and abusive drugs. It is indicated that these abusive drugs affect the central circadian pacemaker. Individuals with substance use disorder display disrupted rhythms. These disrupted rhythms can increase the risk for substance abuse and relapse. It is possible that genetic and/or environmental disturbances to the normal sleep and wake cycle can increase the susceptibility to addiction.

It is difficult to determine if a disturbance in the circadian rhythm is at fault for an increase in prevalence for substance abuse—or if other environmental factors such as stress are to blame.
Changes to the circadian rhythm and sleep occur once an individual begins abusing drugs and alcohol. Once an individual chooses to stop using drugs and alcohol, the circadian rhythm continues to be disrupted.

The stabilization of sleep and the circadian rhythm might possibly help to reduce the vulnerability to addiction and reduce the chances of relapse.

Circadian rhythms and clock genes expressed in brain regions outside the suprachiasmatic nucleus may significantly influence the effects produced by drugs such as cocaine. Moreover, genetic manipulations of clock genes profoundly affect cocaine's actions.

Consequences of Disruption to Circadian Rhythms

Disruption 

Disruption to rhythms usually has a negative effect. Many travelers have experienced the condition known as jet lag, with its associated symptoms of fatigue, disorientation and insomnia.

A number of other disorders, such as bipolar disorder and some sleep disorders such as delayed sleep phase disorder (DSPD), are associated with irregular or pathological functioning of circadian rhythms.

Disruption to rhythms in the longer term is believed to have significant adverse health consequences for peripheral organs outside the brain, in particular in the development or exacerbation of cardiovascular disease.

Studies have shown that maintaining normal sleep and circadian rhythms is important for many aspects of brain and health. A number of studies have also indicated that a power-nap, a short period of sleep during the day, can reduce stress and may improve productivity without any measurable effect on normal circadian rhythms. Circadian rhythms also play a part in the reticular activating system, which is crucial for maintaining a state of consciousness. A reversal in the sleep–wake cycle may be a sign or complication of uremia, azotemia or acute kidney injury. Studies have also helped elucidate how light has a direct effect on human health through its influence on the circadian biology.

Relationship with cardiovascular disease 
One of the first studies to determine how disruption of circadian rhythms causes cardiovascular disease was performed in the Tau hamsters, which have a genetic defect in their circadian clock mechanism. When maintained in a 24-hour light-dark cycle that was "out of sync" with their normal 22 circadian mechanism they developed profound cardiovascular and renal disease; however, when the Tau animals were raised for their entire lifespan on a 22-hour daily light-dark cycle they had a healthy cardiovascular system. The adverse effects of circadian misalignment on human physiology has been studied in the laboratory using a misalignment protocol, and by studying shift workers. Circadian misalignment is associated with many risk factors of cardiovascular disease. High levels of the atherosclerosis biomarker, resistin, have been reported in shift workers indicating the link between circadian misalignment and plaque build up in arteries. Additionally, elevated triacylglyceride levels (molecules used to store excess fatty acids) were observed and contribute to the hardening of arteries, which is associated with cardiovascular diseases including heart attack, stroke and heart disease. Shift work and the resulting circadian misalignment is also associated with hypertension.

Obesity and diabetes 
Obesity and diabetes are associated with lifestyle and genetic factors. Among those factors, disruption of the circadian clockwork and/or misalignment of the circadian timing system with the external environment (e.g., light–dark cycle) can play a role in the development of metabolic disorders.

Shift work or chronic jet lag have profound consequences for circadian and metabolic events in the body. Animals that are forced to eat during their resting period show increased body mass and altered expression of clock and metabolic genes. In humans, shift work that favours irregular eating times is associated with altered insulin sensitivity, diabetes and higher body mass.

Cancer 
Circadian misalignment has also been associated with increased risk of cancer. In mice, the disruption to the essential clock genes, Period genes (Per2, Per1) caused by circadian misalignment was found to accelerate the growth of cancer cells in mice. However, the link between these genes and cancer is dependent on type pathways and genes involved. Significant evidence exists that correlates shift work and therefore circadian misalignment with breast and prostate cancer in humans.

Cognitive Effects 
Reduced cognitive function has been associated with circadian misalignment. Chronic shift workers display increased rates of operational error, impaired visual-motor performance and processing efficacy which can lead to both a reduction in performance and potential safety issues. Increased risk of dementia is associated with chronic night shift workers compared to day shift workers, particularly for individuals over 50 years old.

Society and Culture 
In 2017, Jeffrey C. Hall, Michael W. Young, and Michael Rosbash were awarded Nobel Prize in Physiology or Medicine "for their discoveries of molecular mechanisms controlling the circadian rhythm".

Circadian rhythms was taken as an example of scientific knowledge being transferred into the public sphere.

See also 

 Actigraphy (also known as actimetry)
 ARNTL
 ARNTL2
 Bacterial circadian rhythms
 Circadian rhythm sleep disorders, such as
 Advanced sleep phase disorder
 Delayed sleep phase disorder
 Non-24-hour sleep–wake disorder
 Chronobiology
 CLOCK
 Circasemidian rhythm
 Circaseptan, 7-day biological cycle
 Cryptochrome
 CRY1 and CRY2: the cryptochrome family genes
 Diurnal cycle
 Light effects on circadian rhythm
 Light in school buildings
 PER1, PER2, and PER3: the period family genes
 Photosensitive ganglion cell: part of the eye which is involved in regulating circadian rhythm.
 Polyphasic sleep
 Rev-ErbA alpha
 Segmented sleep
 Sleep architecture (sleep in humans)
 Sleep in non-human animals
 Stefania Follini
 Ultradian rhythm

References

Further reading

External links 

 

 
Sleep
Biology of bipolar disorder
Plant cognition